Waddle may refer to:

 Waddle, Pennsylvania, United States
 Waddle (surname), a surname

See also

 Waddling